Phanerophalla is a genus of moth in the family Gelechiidae. It contains the species Phanerophalla knysnaensis, which is found in South Africa.

References

Endemic moths of South Africa
Anomologinae